Víctor Vázquez may refer to:

Víctor Vázquez (artist), Puerto Rican photographer and conceptual artist
Víctor Vázquez (footballer, born 1989), Spanish football defender
Víctor Vázquez (footballer, born 1987), Spanish football attacking midfielder

See also
Kool A.D., also known as Victor Vazquez (without diacritics)
Victor Vásquez